The Rt Rev David Chellappa (1905–1964) was an Indian Anglican priest.

Born in Tanjore, Chellappa was the first Indian to become Bishop of Madras. Chellappa received a Master of Arts degree from Durham University in 1954.

He became Bishop of Madras the following year.

References

Further reading
P.M. Gnanadurai (2005): Bishop David Chellappa : a biography, Chennai Christian Literature Society
Bishop Sees Need for Church Unity; But South Indian Prelate Notes Potential Dangers in Corporate Merger, New York Times, 8 July 1957
Anitya Sondhi (2014): The Order of the Crest: Tracing the Alumni of Bishop Cotton Boys' School, Bangalore (1865–2015), Penguin UK

External links
Hope College digital commons: papers of Bishop David Chellappa

1905 births
1964 deaths
20th-century Anglican bishops in India
Anglican bishops of Madras
Anglican bishops of Trichy-Tanjore
Alumni of Hatfield College, Durham